Major-General Jonathan Michael Francis Cooper Hall  (born 10 August 1944) is a retired British Army officer, who served as the General Officer Commanding Scotland and the Governor of Edinburgh Castle from 1995 to 1997.

Career
Educated at Taunton School and the Royal Military Academy Sandhurst, Hall was commissioned into the 3rd Carabiniers in 1965. He was appointed commanding officer of the Royal Scots Dragoon Guards in 1984. He went on to be 12th Armoured Brigade in 1989 and Deputy Military Secretary in 1992. He was appointed General Officer Commanding Scotland and Governor of Edinburgh Castle in 1995 and retired in 1997.

On leaving the Army in 1997, he was selected for the post of Lieutenant Governor (CEO equivalent), Accounting Officer and ex-officio Commissioner of the Royal Hospital Chelsea. He was also given the colonelcy in 1998 of the Royal Scots Dragoon Guards, a position he held until 2003.

In 1999, he was appointed a member of Her Majesty's Body Guard of the Honourable Corps of Gentlemen at Arms and was involved in the Queen's Diamond Jubilee celebrations as well as the Wedding of Prince William and Catherine Middleton. He was promoted Standard Bearer in August 2012.

He was appointed Officer of the Order of the British Empire (OBE) in 1987, a Companion of the Order of the Bath (CB) in 1998, and Knight Commander of the Order of Francis I in 2014.

Family
In 1968 he married Sarah Linda Hudson: they have two daughters.

References

 

1944 births
Living people
British Army major generals
Companions of the Order of the Bath
Officers of the Order of the British Empire
Deputy Lieutenants of Dorset
3rd Carabiniers officers
People educated at Taunton School
Graduates of the Royal Military Academy Sandhurst
Royal Scots Dragoon Guards officers
Honourable Corps of Gentlemen at Arms